Víctor García Blázquez (born 13 March 1985) is a Spanish athlete competing in 3000 metres steeplechase. His personal best at the 3000 metres steeplechase is 8:15.20.

Garcia got bronze medal at the 2012 European Championships in Helsinki at the 3000 metres steeplechase event.

Competition record

External links

1985 births
Living people
Spanish male steeplechase runners
Athletes (track and field) at the 2012 Summer Olympics
Olympic athletes of Spain
European Athletics Championships medalists